Audiovisual Communicators, Inc. is a Philippine radio network. Its main headquarters is located at the 17th Floor, Strata 200 Bldg., F. Ortigas Jr. Rd., Ortigas Center, Pasig. ACI operates Top 40 stations across major cities in the Philippines under the Monster Radio branding.

Monster Radio stations

References

Companies based in Pasig
Philippine radio networks